The San Pasqual Valley AVA is an American Viticultural Area in northern San Diego County, California. It is located in the San Pasqual Valley of the Peninsular Ranges, in Southern California.

San Pasqual Valley was the fourth wine region to be designated an American Viticultural Area when the AVA was created in 1981. The AVA is encroached on by the cities of San Diego, Poway, and Escondido, resulting in relatively high land values but limited viticultural potential.

Climate
The AVA belongs to Region IV on the Winkler scale. The climate in this appellation is desert-like but tempered by cool breezes from the Pacific Ocean, with long growing seasons (average temperatures above  year-round), warm winters with nighttime lows rarely dipping below , and summers with daily highs rarely exceeding . With cooler evenings and granite-based soils that drain well, grapes from this area are able to retain their colors and balanced acidity.

Vineyards
The area is planted with a wide range of Vitis vinifera with Grenache, Merlot,  Sangiovese, Syrah, Tempranillo and Viognier being some of the most widely planted. The AVA is defined roughly to include both coasts of San Dieguito River on the east side of I-15, between San Diego and Escondido, up to an elevation of 500 feet.

There is one commercial vineyard in this AVA, named the Orfila Winery. The Ferrara Winery and Cordiano Winery are located in the San Pasqual Valley area, but they are both technically outside the boundaries of the AVA.

References

American Viticultural Areas of Southern California
Geography of San Diego County, California
Peninsular Ranges
Valleys of San Diego County, California
American Viticultural Areas
American Viticultural Areas of California
1981 establishments in California